St. Mary's Residential Public School, formerly St. Mary's Residential Central School, Tiruvalla, is a senior secondary school in  Tiruvalla, Kerala, India. It was established by St. Mary's Educational and Cultural Society Tiruvalla, a registered charitable Trust.

The school was started in 1974. It is affiliated to ( C.B.S.E ). It was founded in 1974 by Dr. P. T Abraham, an educationist and a philanthropist. The school is managed by St Mary's Educational and cultural society Thiruvalla.

St. Mary's Educational and cultural society, a charitable organization, was registered in 1974, with a view to render service in educational and social service. In the same year, St. Mary's Residential Public  School was founded by the brother of the late Chev.T.Thomas, the founder of St.Mary's group of Schools and colleges in Chennai. In 1987, he started five more secondary schools in Thiruvananthapuram, Kollam, Alappuzha, Pathanapuram and Kayamkulam. The school began operation in a rented building at Tangasseri with 275 students on roll. The Senior Secondary School has classes from L.K.G to 12. It offers Science and Commerce stream at +2 level.

At present school has 1000 students and 50 teaching staff on roll.

Crest 
The school's crest is the two alphabets S and M joined together and encrypted on a shield with a crown on top. Below the shield there is a band with the Latin writing "Domine Illumina Me" meaning "Enlighten me, O Lord".

Uniform 
Uniform is a powder blue shirt, check shorts with bow or tie with black socks and black leather shoes and school belt for boys up to class 4 and navy blue pants with powder blue shirt and tie with black leather belt. Navy blue pinafore with tie and white shirt and school belt for girls up to 8th and white salwar with navy blue bottom and pinafore for girls from class 9. Every Wednesday, the uniform is the colour shirt for boys and girls according to their houses in regards to being the day playing sports.

External links

References

 

Christian schools in Kerala
Boarding schools in Kerala
Central Board of Secondary Education
Schools in Pathanamthitta district
Educational institutions established in 1974
1974 establishments in Kerala